Ben Addis is a Welsh actor known for his work in theatre and television,.

Early life and education 
Addis was born in Blaenavon. He was part of Gwent Young People's Theatre (GYPT) in Abergavenny and The National Youth Theatre of Wales. He trained at Bristol Old Vic Theatre School.

Career 
Theatre credits include: Rock and Roll (Duke of York's Theatre), King Lear (RSC), Never So Good (National Theatre), Antigone and Widower's Houses (Manchester Royal Exchange), Cinderella (Warwick Arts Centre / Lyric Hammersmith) and Eurydice (ATC/Plymouth Drum/Young Vic).

Film and TV credits include: Lewis (ITV) and Martin Scorsese's Hugo. 

In February 2020, Addis played the role of Dr. Parker in Channel 4 soap Hollyoaks.

Filmography

Film

Television

References

External links

Personal web page

Living people
Welsh male stage actors
Welsh male television actors
People from Blaenavon
Year of birth missing (living people)